Rita Sanz-Agero (born November 8, 1991, in Guatemala City) is a female modern pentathlete from Guatemala. At age sixteen, Sanz-Agero became the youngest modern pentathlete to compete at the 2008 Summer Olympics in Beijing, where she finished thirty-fourth in the women's event, with a score of 4,844 points.

Sanz-Agero is also the daughter of María Isabel Sanz; the granddaughter of Rita de Luna; and the niece of Silvia de Luna, all of whom were Olympic athletes.

References

External links
  (archived page from Pentathlon.org)
 NBC 2008 Olympics profile

1991 births
Living people
Guatemalan female modern pentathletes
Guatemalan female equestrians
Olympic modern pentathletes of Guatemala
Modern pentathletes at the 2008 Summer Olympics
Modern pentathletes at the 2007 Pan American Games
Equestrians at the 2011 Pan American Games
Pan American Games competitors for Guatemala